{{Infobox person
| name               = Shawn Morales
| image              = Shawn Morales Pit Crew Member by DVSROSS.jpg
| caption            = 
| birth_name         = 
| birth_date         = 
| birth_place        = Santa Monica, California
| alma_mater         = 
| occupation         = 
| yearsactive        = 2011–present
| spouse             = 
| known_for          = {{hlist|RuPaul's Drag Race|RuPaul's Drag Race All Stars|}} Dragula
| module             = 
| website            = 
}}

Shawn Morales (born July 21, 1978) is an American model, actor, and nightlife personality based in Los Angeles, California.

RuPaul's Drag Race

In 2011 while working as a gogo dancer at local gay bars, Shawn auditioned for the RuPaul's Drag Race "Pit Crew" (also known as the Scruff Pit Crew). They are a group of men who appear on each season of Drag Race. The men of the Pit Crew are typically dressed only in their underwear, assisting RuPaul and contestants in various challenges on the reality show. They usually have no dialogue on the show, mainly appearing as "eye candy" for viewers and contestants. Morales became the first non-African-American man to join the Pit Crew, joining in season three. He would also go on to appear in RuPaul's music video for the song "Champion." Morales remained with the show until he was axed before Season 7 began. No reason ever was given for Morales' departure from the show but, after a well-circulated Huffington Post'' article about Gold's Gym revoking Morales' gym membership due to his body odor, rumors swirled that there may have been a link between the two. Morales reprised his role in Season 10, as well as guest appearances on other RuPaul's Drag Race and their production company, World of Wonder's companion shows.

Personal Life

On November 5th, 2020, Morales married his husband Levi Packer in Brownwood, Texas.

Filmography

Television

Web series

Music video appearances

References

External links
 

1978 births
Living people
21st-century American male actors
American male models
LGBT models